Astrotischeria heteroterae is a moth of the family Tischeriidae. It was described by Frey and Boll in 1878. It is found in North America.

References

Moths described in 1878
Tischeriidae